Krapivensky Uyezd (Крапивенский уезд) was one of the subdivisions of the Tula Governorate of the Russian Empire. It was situated in the central part of the governorate. Its administrative centre was Krapivna.

Demographics
At the time of the Russian Empire Census of 1897, Krapivensky Uyezd had a population of 102,926. Of these, 99.8% spoke Russian as their native language. Its administrative center, Krapivna, had a population of 6,146.

References

 
Uezds of Tula Governorate
Tula Governorate